Patricia Villarreal Vargas (born June 5, 1983) is a Mexican former swimmer, who specialized in long-distance freestyle events. She represented Mexico, as a 17-year-old, at the 2000 Summer Olympics, and also became a member of Sharks Swim Club at the Bolles School in Jacksonville, Florida under her personal coach Larry Shofe.

Villarreal swam only in a long-distance freestyle double at the 2000 Summer Olympics in Sydney. She achieved FINA B-standards of 4:22.27 (400 m freestyle) and 8:52.04 (800 m freestyle) from the Mexican Youth Olympic Festival in Hermosillo. On the second day of the Games, Villarreal placed thirty-third in the 400 m freestyle. Swimming in heat one, she came up with a fantastic swim on the final lap to pick up a third seed in 4:21.03, sufficiently enough for her lifetime best. Five days later, in the 800 m freestyle, Villarreal participated in heat one against three other swimmers Ivanka Moralieva of Bulgaria, Lin Chi-chan of Chinese Taipei, and Cecilia Biagioli of Argentina. Starting from last on an early length, she held off a challenge from Lin to grab a second seed and twenty-first overall in 8:54.79, two seconds below her entry standard.

References

1983 births
Living people
Olympic swimmers of Mexico
Swimmers at the 1999 Pan American Games
Swimmers at the 2000 Summer Olympics
Mexican female freestyle swimmers
Sportspeople from Torreón
Pan American Games competitors for Mexico
20th-century Mexican women
21st-century Mexican women